Havang-e Pain (also Romanized as Hāvang-e Pā’īn; also known as Hāvanān-e Pā’īn) is a village in Baqeran Rural District, in the Central District of Birjand County, South Khorasan Province, Iran. At the 2006 census, its population was 97, in 30 families. It's assistamt is MohammadHossein Havangi

References 

Populated places in Birjand County